The 1993 Sandown 500 was an endurance race for Group 3A Touring Cars and selected Group 3E Series Production Cars, held at the Sandown circuit in Victoria, Australia on 12 September 1993. The event was staged over 161 laps of the 3.10 km circuit, a total distance of 499 km. It was the 28th Sandown 500.

The race was won by  Geoff Brabham and David Parsons driving a Ford Falcon EB entered by Peter Jackson Racing.

Classes
Cars competed in two classes:
 A: Group 3A Touring Cars
 E: Group 3E Production Cars

Results

See also
1993 Australian Touring Car season

References

Further reading
 Drive to Survive, Australian Motor Racing Year, 1993/94, pages 236-239

External links
The winning Ford Falcon EB at the 1993 Sandown 500, www.pressreader.com, as archived at web.archive.org

Motorsport at Sandown
Sandown 500
Pre-Bathurst 500